KBSU-FM (90.3 FM) is a radio station licensed to Boise, Idaho. The station is owned by Boise State University, and is the flagship affiliate of Boise State Public Radio's "Music" network.

The station airs classical music and other entertainment programming from American Public Media and Public Radio International.

KBSU-FM broadcasts in HD.

Repeaters
KBSU-FM's programming is repeated on KBSM in McCall, Idaho. The station's signal is also relayed by the following translator stations.

See also
 List of jazz radio stations in the United States

References

External links
Official Website

BSU
BSU
Classical music radio stations in the United States
NPR member stations
Boise State University
Radio stations established in 1976
1976 establishments in Idaho